EgyptAir Flight 648 was a regularly scheduled international flight between Athens' Ellinikon International Airport (Greece) and Cairo International Airport (Egypt). On 23 November 1985, a Boeing 737-200 airliner, registered SU-AYH, servicing the flight was hijacked by the terrorist organization Abu Nidal. The subsequent raid on the aircraft by Egyptian troops killed 56 of the 86 passengers, 2 of the 3 hijackers and 2 of the 6  crew, making the hijacking of Flight 648 one of the deadliest such incidents in history.

Hijacking

On 23 November 1985, Flight 648 took off at 8 pm on its Athens-to-Cairo route. Ten minutes after takeoff, three Palestinian members of Abu Nidal hijacked the aircraft, the same group also responsible for the hijacking of Pan Am Flight 73 a year later. The terrorists, declaring themselves to be Egyptian revolutionaries over the intercom, were heavily armed with guns and grenades. 

The terrorists' leader, Salem Chakore, proceeded to check all passports while Omar Rezaq went to the cockpit to change the aircraft's course. At the same time, Chakore had the European, Australian, Israeli and American passengers sit in the front of the aircraft while the rest, including the Greeks and Egyptians were sent to the back. Chakore saw an Australian passenger, Tony Lyons (aged 36), holding a camera. Believing Lyons had taken a picture of him, Chakore took the camera and ripped the film out before slamming the camera into the wall. Chakore came up to an Egyptian Security Service agent, Methad Mustafa Kamal (aged 26), who reached into his coat as if to pull out his passport. Instead, he withdrew a handgun and opened fire, killing Chakore; he subsequently engaged in a shootout with the other hijacker, Bou Said Nar Al-din Mohammed (Nar Al-Din Bou Said). 19 shots were fired until Kamal and two flight attendants were wounded by Rezaq. In the exchange of fire the fuselage was punctured, causing a rapid depressurization.

Libya was the original destination of the hijackers, but due to a lack of fuel, damage from the shootout and negative publicity, Malta was chosen. While approaching Malta the aircraft was running dangerously low on fuel, experiencing serious pressurization problems and carrying wounded passengers. However, Maltese authorities did not give permission for the aircraft to land; the Maltese government had previously refused permission to other hijacked aircraft, including on 23 September 1982 when an Alitalia aircraft was hijacked on its way to Italy. The EgyptAir 648 hijackers insisted, and forced the pilots Hani Galal and Imad Mounib (both aged 39) to land at Luqa Airport. As a last-ditch attempt to stop the landing, the runway lights were switched off, but the pilot managed to land the damaged aircraft safely.

Nationalities

Breakdown by nationality as per New York Times. A notable passenger was actress Lupita Pallás, who, with her daughter Laila, were among the fatalities.

Standoff

At first, Maltese authorities were optimistic they could solve the crisis. Malta had good relations with the Arab world, and 12 years earlier had successfully resolved a potentially more serious situation when a KLM Boeing 747 landed there under similar circumstances (KLM Flight 861). The Maltese Prime Minister, Karmenu Mifsud Bonnici, rushed to the airport's control tower and assumed responsibility for the negotiations.

The remaining two hijackers allowed medics and engineers to examine the injured and the damage to the plane, respectively. The medics confirmed that the lead hijacker, Salem Chakore, was dead while the sky marshal that killed him, Kamal, was still alive. In a rage, Omar Rezaq, who assumed command of the hijacking, shot Kamal again as he was lead off the plane. Somehow, Kamal survived. The doctor told Rezaq the sky marshal was dead and was able to get him off the plane.

Aided by an interpreter, Bonnici refused to refuel the aircraft, or to withdraw Maltese armed forces which had surrounded the plane, until all passengers were released. 16 Filipino and 16 Egyptian passengers and two injured flight attendants were allowed off the plane. The hijackers then started shooting hostages, starting with Tamar Artzi (aged 24), an Israeli woman, whom they shot in the head and back. Artzi survived her wounds. Assuming command of the hijacking, Rezaq threatened to kill a passenger every 15 minutes until his demands were met. His next victim was Nitzan Mendelson (aged 23), another Israeli woman, who died a week later after being declared brain dead. Mendelson realized what was to happen so she resisted. Rezaq grabbed her by the hair and lead her out onto the staircase before shooting her. While tossing Mendelson's body down the stairs, he noticed Artzi move. He shot her through the back from the top of the stairs. Again, Artzi survived her wounds. He then targeted three Americans, having their hands tied behind them.

After the shooting of Mendelson, Maltese soldiers surrounded the plane. Spotting them from the cockpit window, Rezaq demanded that they withdraw the soldiers. Negotiators told him he had no choice but to surrender. Rezaq was informed that if the plane left Malta, American jets based in Italy would intercept and shoot down the plane. This enraged Rezaq.

Over the intercom, Rezaq had a flight attendant call forward Patrick Scott Baker (aged 28), an American fisherman-biologist on vacation. Rezaq stepped back when Baker locked eyes with him as he came forward. Tony Lyons, an Australian passenger who could see the stairs platform from his window seat later stated that he saw that Rezaq had to raise his gun in order to shoot Baker, who was about 6'5" tall. The bullet grazed Baker's skull after he moved it at the last second but played dead. Rezaq pushed his body down the steps. Baker waited a few minutes before making a run for it, hands still tied behind his back.

Fifteen minutes later, Rezaq called for Scarlett Marie Rogenkamp (aged 38), a U.S. Air Force civilian employee. Making her kneel on the staircase, Rezaq shot her in the back of the head, killing her instantly. Her body was later taken to a hospital, where she was identified by Baker.

Jackie Nink Pflug (aged 30) wasn't shot until the next morning. Of the five passengers shot, Artzi, Baker and Pflug survived; Mendelson died in a Maltese hospital a week after the hijacking after being declared brain dead. For five hours, Pflug drifted in and out of consciousness until an airport grounds crew retrieved her body on its way to the morgue. They discovered she was still alive and rushed her to the nearby hospital.

France, the UK and the United States all offered to send anti-hijack forces. Bonnici was under heavy pressure from both the hijackers and from the United States and Egypt, whose ambassadors were at the airport. The non-aligned Maltese government feared that the Americans or the Israelis would arrive and take control of the area, as the U.S. Naval Air Station Sigonella was only 20 minutes away. A U.S. Air Force C-130 Hercules with an aeromedical evacuation team from Rhein-Main Air Base (2nd Aeromedical Evacuation Squadron) near Frankfurt, Germany, and rapid-deploying surgical teams from Wiesbaden Air Force Medical Center were on standby at the U.S. Navy Hospital at Naples. 

When the U.S. told Maltese authorities that Egypt had a special forces counterterrorism team trained by the U.S. Delta Force ready to move in, they were granted permission to come. The Egyptian Unit 777 under the command of Major-General Kamal Attia was flown in, led by four American officers. Negotiations were prolonged as much as possible, and it was agreed that the plane should be attacked on the morning of 25 November when food was to be taken into the aircraft. Soldiers dressed as caterers would jam the door open and attack.

Raid
Without warning, Egyptian commandos launched the raid about an hour and a half before it had been originally planned. They blasted open the passenger doors and luggage compartment doors with explosives.  52 passengers – including pregnant women and children – suffocated from the fumes that enveloped the aircraft when the soldiers placed a bomb underneath the fuselage to break into the hold. Another five were shot by them. According to Dr Abela Medici, two kilos of highly-explosive Semtex were used, which provided more power than was necessary to allow the commandos safe entry into the plane. Mifsud Bonnici stated that these explosions caused the internal plastic of the plane to catch fire, causing widespread suffocation. However, the Times of Malta, quoting sources at the airport, reported that when the hijackers realized  they were under attack, they lobbed hand grenades into the passenger area, killing people and igniting the fire aboard.

The storming of the aircraft killed 54 of the remaining 87 passengers, as well as two crew members and one hijacker. Only one hijacker — Omar Rezaq, who had survived — remained undetected by the Maltese government. Rezaq came out of the cockpit only to be shot in the chest by a commando, throwing a grenade as he went down. Captain Galal subsequently tried to attack Rezaq with the cockpit axe, but Rezaq managed to escape from the aircraft. (The New York Times reported at one point, however, that the hijackers' leader shot Captain Galal, grazing his forehead, and Captain Galal hit the hijacker with an ax, then Egyptian soldiers shot the hijacker.) None of the Egyptian commandos were killed but one had a leg blown off.

Rezaq removed his hood and ammunition and pretended to be an injured passenger. Egyptian commandos tracked Rezaq to St Luke's General Hospital and, holding the doctors and medical staff at gunpoint, entered the casualty ward looking for him. He was arrested when some of the passengers in the hospital recognized him.

Rezaq faced trial in Malta, but with no anti-terrorism legislation, he was tried on other charges. There was widespread fear that terrorists would hijack a Maltese plane or carry out a terrorist attack in Malta as an act of retribution. Rezaq received a 25-year sentence.
For reasons unclear, Maltese authorities released him some seven years later, in February 1993, and allowed him to board a plane to Ghana. His release caused a diplomatic incident between Malta and the U.S. because Maltese law strictly prohibits trying a person twice, in any jurisdiction, on charges connected to the same series of events (similar to but having wider limitations compared to classic double jeopardy).

Rezaq's itinerary was to carry him from there to Nigeria, and then to Ethiopia, and finally to Sudan. Ghanaian officials detained Rezaq for several months, but eventually allowed him to proceed to Nigeria. When Rezaq's plane landed in Nigeria, Nigerian authorities denied him entry into the country and handed him to FBI agents departing for the United States. He was brought before a U.S. court and, on 8 October 1996, sentenced to life imprisonment with a no-parole recommendation.

Aftermath and criticism
In his 1989 book Massacre in Malta, John A. Mizzi wrote:

Mizzi added:

Mizzi also mentioned how Maltese soldiers positioned in the vicinity of the aircraft were equipped with rifles but were not issued ammunition. An Italian secret service report on the incident showed how the fire inside the aircraft was caused by the Egyptian commandos who placed explosives in the aircraft cargo hold, the most vulnerable part of the aircraft, as it held the oxygen tanks which blew up. During the hijacking, only the Socialist Party media and state-controlled television were given information on the incident. Such was the censorship of the media, that the Maltese people first heard of the disaster through RAI TV, when its correspondent Enrico Mentana spoke live on the air via a direct phone call: "Parlo da Malta. Qui c'è stato un massacro ..." ("I'm speaking from Malta. Here there's just been a massacre ...") Shortly before this broadcast, a news bulletin on the Maltese national television had erroneously stated that all passengers had been released and were safe.

Decisions taken by the Maltese government drew criticism from overseas. The United States protested to Malta about U.S. personnel sent to resolve the issue having been confined to Air Squadron HQ and the U.S. Embassy in Floriana. The United States had seen the situation as so ‘hot’ that it had ordered naval ships, including an aircraft carrier, to move toward Malta for contingency purposes.

EgyptAir still flies the Athens–Cairo route, now assigned flight numbers 748 and 750 and flown by Boeing 737-800. The flight number 648 is now on its Riyadh–Cairo route.

In popular culture
The events of the hijacking were related in an account by American survivor Jackie Nink Pflug, who had been shot in the head, on the Biography Channel television program I Survived..., which was broadcast on 13 April 2009. Laurence Zrinzo, the neurologist and neurosurgeon who established neurosurgery as a subspecialty in the Maltese islands, performed Pflug's neurosurgical procedure. She  related details about the flight and the attack in her 2001 book, Miles to Go Before I Sleep. The incident was chronicled and reenacted in an Interpol Investigates episode, "Terror in the Skies", broadcast by the National Geographic Channel.

The hijacking is also the subject of the book Valinda, Our Daughter, written by Canadian author Gladys Taylor.

The events of the hijacking are described in and used to further the plot in Brad Thor's novel, Path of the Assassin.

A similar situation appeared in the 1999 film Mummy by Russian director Denis Yevstigneyev. This is a movie based on the hijacking of Aeroflot Flight 3739 in 1988.

See also

Beslan school siege
EgyptAir Flight 181 – EgyptAir flight hijacked in 2016
EgyptAir Flight 321 – EgyptAir flight hijacked in 1976
 Egyptian raid on Larnaca International Airport
List of aircraft hijackings

References

External links
BBC News – On This Day: Commandoes storm hijacked plane

1985 in Greece
1985 in Egypt
1985 in Malta
1985 murders in Europe
Abu Nidal attacks
Accidents and incidents involving the Boeing 737 Original
Aircraft hijackings
Airliner accidents and incidents caused by hijacking
Aviation accidents and incidents in 1985
Aviation accidents and incidents in Malta
648
International incidents
Luqa
Mass murder in 1985
Mass murder in Europe
November 1985 crimes
November 1985 events in Europe
Palestinian terrorist incidents in Europe
Terrorist incidents in Europe in 1985
Creating Category:Palestinian terrorist incidents in Greece
Terrorist incidents in Malta